The 3001 Class as constructed by William Dean at the Swindon Works of the Great Western Railway in 1891-2 was the culmination of the tradition of GWR 2-2-2 locomotives that had begun with Gooch's North Star over 50 years earlier. The 3001s, which had  driving wheels, were built in two batches:

Because of the restricted width available between the large driving wheels, these locomotives were fitted with narrow  diameter boilers. In order to increase the heating surface the boilers were made longer than previous types, and were fitted with raised fireboxes. Despite the fact that the broad gauge was in its very final months, new broad gauge engines were still needed to maintain services, and eight of these new engines, Nos. 3021-3028, were built (as "convertibles") with the wheels outside the frames, to run on the broad gauge. They were duly converted to "narrow" (standard) gauge in summer 1892.

These engines were too heavy at the front end, and after a derailment in 1893 it was decided to give them front bogies. Thus transformed, in 1894 the class joined the 3031 Class, considered one of the most elegant of the entire late Victorian era.

References

Sources

3001
Steam locomotives of Great Britain
2-2-2 locomotives
Railway locomotives introduced in 1892
Passenger locomotives